The Shadhin Bangla football team was formed by Bangladesh Krira Samity of the Bangladeshi government in exile shortly after the start of liberation war in 1971. This is the first instance of a Bangladesh national football team in any form. The team toured throughout India playing a total of 16 friendly matches to raise international awareness and economic support for the liberation war.

The Shadhin Bangla football team captain Zakaria Pintoo, was the first person to hoist the Bangladesh flag outside the territorial Bangladesh. By the end of the 16th match the team had contributed Tk 5 lac to Muktijuddho Fund in 1971.

Players

Officials

In popular culture
 The 2010 Bengali-language film titled Jaago is inspired by Shadin Bangla football team.
 Based on the football team, 2022 Bengali-language film Damal is produced by Impress Telefilm.

See also
 Football in Bangladesh
 Bangladesh Football Federation
 Bangladesh national football team

References

 Bangladesh Football Federation official website

Further reading

External links
 Bangladesh Football Federation official website
 

Bangladesh Liberation War
Football in Bangladesh
Bangladesh national football team
Association football clubs established in 1971